Project commissioning is the process of assuring that all systems and components of a building or industrial plant are designed, installed, tested, operated, and maintained according to the operational requirements of the owner or final client. A commissioning process may be applied not only to new projects but also to existing units and systems subject to expansion, renovation or revamping. 

In practice, the commissioning process is the integrated application of a set of engineering techniques and procedures to check, inspect and test every operational component of the project: from individual functions (such as instruments and equipment) up to complex amalgamations (such as modules, subsystems and systems).

Commissioning activities in the broader sense are applicable to all phases of the project from the basic and detailed design, procurement, construction and assembly until the final handover of the unit to the owner, sometimes including an assisted operation phase.

Objective and impact 

The main objective of commissioning is to effect the safe and orderly handover of the unit from the constructor to the owner, guaranteeing its operability in terms of performance, reliability, safety and information traceability. Additionally, when executed in a planned and effective way, commissioning normally represents an essential factor for the fulfillment of schedule, costs, safety and quality requirements of the project.

Commissioning management systems 

For complex projects, the large volume and complexity of commissioning data, together with the need to guarantee adequate information traceability, normally leads to the use of powerful IT tools, known as commissioning management systems, to allow effective planning and monitoring of the commissioning activities.

Independent discipline 
There is currently no formal education or university degree which addresses the training or certification of a Project Commissioning Engineer. Various short training courses and on-line training are available, but they are designed for qualified engineers. 

Large civil and industrial projects for which Commissioning as an independent discipline is as important as traditional engineering disciplines, i.e. civil, naval, chemical, mechanical, electrical, electronic, instrumentation, automation, or telecom engineering, include chemical and petrochemical plants, oil and gas platforms and pipelines, metallurgical plants, paper and cellulose plants, coal handling plants, thermoelectric and hydroelectric plants, buildings, bridges, highways, and railroads.

See also   

Building commissioning
Building enclosure commissioning
Ship commissioning

References  

Engineering disciplines
Project management